Youssef Gergi Abed (1911 – December 2006), also known as Pépé Abed, was a Lebanese adventurer, explorer and entrepreneur. He was dubbed as the 'Hugh Hefner of the Middle East', he was frequently linked with a series of beauty icons from around the world.

Early life
Abed was born in Rmeil but spent much of his time as a child and young adult in Mexico. In the early 1950s, Pepe, who was by that time a jeweler, returned to Lebanon to see family.

Career

Abed pioneered Lebanon's tourist potential with the Acapulco beach club in Jnah, the Bacchus hotel and nightclub in Beirut, the Admiral's Club in Tyre, the Hacienda in Amshit and his personal refuge, the Byblos Fishing Club.

In 1962, he opened the Pépé Abed Museum in Byblos adjacent to the Fishing Club. This museum gathers Greek, Roman and Phoenician antiquities that Pépé Abed pluck from the bed of the sea during decades of diving. The museum is supervised by UNESCO

Among the more high-profile visitors to the Byblos Fishing Club were Swedish actress Anita Ekberg, French crooner Johnny Hallyday, Kim Novak, Ginger Rogers, Ann-Margret, the poet Said Akl, Czech President Václav Havel, Mexican President Miguel Alemán Valdés and Lebanese President Camille Chamoun, among numerous other heads of state.

In the 1960s, the Byblos Fishing Club had become the world-class destination for the decade's jet-setting glitterati, and Pepe had a veritable empire on his hands. In addition to the Admiral's Club, the Hacienda and the Bacchus, the family established a full-service travel agency to coordinate a seamless experience for a clientele of bold-faced names.

Pepe bought seven caves from their fishermen owners and turned them into a restaurant serving traditional Lebanese fare of fish and mezze, washed down with local wine or arak.

References

1911 births
2006 deaths
Lebanese Maronites
20th-century Mexican businesspeople
Mexican Maronites
Lebanese emigrants to Mexico
20th-century  Lebanese businesspeople